Matty Mullins (born July 3, 1988) is an American singer and songwriter. He is the lead vocalist of the metalcore band Memphis May Fire.

Life and career 

Matty Mullins was born on July 3, 1988, in Spokane, Washington. His father was a pastor. He grew up in a Conservative Christian family and was only allowed to attend the concerts of Christian rock bands. Mullins graduated from Shadle Park High School. At the age of 18, he married Brittany Mullins. He is living in Nashville, TN.

Before joining Memphis May Fire through an open audition in 2008 Mullins played in several local music groups in Spokane. He worked on the Between the Lies EP and the albums Sleepwalking, The Hollow, Challenger, Unconditional, This Light I Hold, and Broken.

He is featured as guest vocalist for several acts like Woe, Is Me, Hands Like Houses, Sleeping with Sirens, For Today, Spoken, Nowhere To Be Found and Yellowcard. In 2013 it was announced that Mullins started a solo project. His solo album was scheduled for release on September 23, 2014, via Rise Records. It debuted at 66 on the Billboard 200 charts in the US the week of October 11, 2014.

During one of Memphis May Fire's shows on the 2013 Vans Warped Tour, Mullins commented on the way some of the girls in the crowd were dressed, calling them "slutty", drawing criticism from The Amity Affliction vocalist Joel Birch. Mullins later apologized and stated that his intentions were good—attempting to remind the young women to respect themselves—but his words were poorly chosen.

Musical influences 

He stated being influenced by bands like Every Time I Die, Architects, Bring Me the Horizon and Asking Alexandria.

Mullins is the main songwriter for Memphis May Fire. His lyrics often deal with personal experiences, both as a person and a musician, and his Christian faith.

Mullins wrote "Prove Me Right" about the band's former label, Trustkill Records, and is a critique on the younger music industry.

Personal life 

In 2016, Mullins launched a men's grooming brand: On Point Pomade. He is active with his wife's, Brittany, peer-to-peer mentoring nonprofit, Beneath the Skin.

Discography

Memphis May Fire 

EPs
 2010: Between the Lies (Bullet Tooth Records)

Studio albums
Sleepwalking (2009)
The Hollow (2011)
Challenger (2012)
Unconditional (2014)
 This Light I Hold (2016)
 Broken (2018)
 Remade in Misery (2022)

Solo 

Studio albums
 2014: Matty Mullins (Rise Records)
 2017: Unstoppable (BEC Recordings)

Nights in Fire 
Studio albums
 Dark and Desperate Times (2008)

Collaborations

References 

1989 births
Living people
American rock singers
Musicians from Spokane, Washington
21st-century American singers